Dłużniów is a village in the administrative district of Gmina Dołhobyczów, within Hrubieszów County, Lublin Voivodeship, in eastern Poland, close to the border with Ukraine.

The village has a population of 40.

German occupation
 
Before the war, Maks Glazermann, a Jewish engineer from Lwów owned an estate in Dłużniów.   During the German occupation he was initially left to run the property. In the summer of 1941, Julek (Joel/Jakób) Brandt, a leader of the Zionist youth movement Betar from Chorzów arranged for several hundred members of the Betar youth movement in the Warsaw Ghetto to work on  farms and estates in the area, including Glazermann's  in Dłużniów.  Among them was Hanka Tauber,  a young woman from Warsaw. Her account of what went on in Dłużniów was recorded in the diary of Abraham Lewin. Tauber returned to Warsaw, but most of the Betar youth who remained were killed in the spring of 1942.

References

Villages in Hrubieszów County
Holocaust locations in Poland